The Nuruosmaniye Mosque is an 18th-century Ottoman mosque located in the Çemberlitaş neighbourhood of Fatih district in Istanbul, Turkey, which was inscribed in the Tentative list of World Heritage Sites in Turkey in 2016. 

Designed by a Greek architect named Simeon, the Nuruosmaniye mosque was the first monumental Ottoman building to exemplify the new Ottoman baroque style, which introduced baroque and neoclassical elements from Europe. The mosque's ornamentation and its curved courtyard display its baroque influences. The dome of the mosque is the fourth largest in Istanbul, behind the Hagia Sophia, Süleymaniye Mosque, and Fatih Mosque, respectively. The Nuruosmaniye mosque is part of a larger religious complex, or külliye, acting as a centre of culture, religion, and education for the neighborhood.

The mosque is located on Istanbul's second hill, site of the mosque of Fatma Huton; that mosque was burned due to a fire. In Constantinople, the area of the Nurosmaniye Mosque was close to the Forum of Constantine, where the Column of Constantine still stands. Surrounding the mosque is Istanbul's Grand Bazaar. After the construction of the Sultan Ahmed Mosque, the Nurosmaniye mosque was the first imperial mosque to be built in 100 years.

Architecture
The Nuruosmaniye Mosque was designed by a Greek architect named Simeon. It was the first monumental Ottoman building to exemplify the new baroque style introduced from Europe during the Tulip Period of the Ottoman Empire. This style was the Ottoman Baroque style. It helped reshape the city of Istanbul by using a newer architecture style, moving it away from Ottoman Classical architecture. It was one the first monuments to use this style that was heavily influenced by European models.

It was commissioned from the order of Sultan Mahmud I in 1748 and completed under his brother and successor Sultan Osman III in 1755. It was named Nuruosmaniye Mosque, meaning "The light of Osman", after Osman III, but also because of the 174 windows which illuminate the mosque's hall.The prayer hall is covered by a single dome 25 metres (82 feet) in diameter and 43.50 meters (142.7 feet) high above the floor level. The mosque utilizes a system of iron bracing running up from the floor, through the walls, and to the ceiling of the dome. The mosque material is made out of cut stone and marble. The general form of the building is described best as "straining everywhere to melt straight lines into curves." The complex has two minarets, each with two balconies. The courtyard of the mosque is designed in the shape of a horseshoe, unprecedented in Ottoman mosques.

The mosque contains a library, madrasa, and a tomb, which are enclosed in a prescient with an irregular shape, therefore the sites slope downward in the north area. In the back-garden there is a Türbe (tomb) built for Shehsuvar Sultan, mother of Osman III, which also houses other royal family members. The other components of the complex are:

 The mosque has two gates, the east and west gate. The western gate also contains the fountain. Both gates open onto the Grand Bazaar, which allows a flow of traffic.
 The sebil is attached to the exterior wall of the compound, and was traditionally used for dispersing water to the public and for ablutions before prayer. It is currently used as a carpet store.
 The madrasa, (Islamic school) consisting of 20 domed rooms and one large classroom.
The imaret, or public soup kitchen, which adjoins the madrasa.
 The library is a separate single story building in the Külliye, with a private entrance for the Sultan. The books and manuscripts, some of which are still held on site, are part of the larger Süleymaniye library. The works originally held there were personal collections of Mahmud I and Osman III with a total of 7,600 volumes of which 5052 are manuscripts.
It is because of mosques like this, colleges, convents, and other instutitons that the Süleymaniye library was able to build their collection 
The Hünkâr Kasrı, a lodge for the sultan and royal family, is a three-story building with private access. In the case of the Nuruosmaniye mosque, the lodge has access to the Hünkâr Mahfili within the prayer hall.
Lights: The windows lining the walls of the mosque allows natural light to travel through. The circular courtyard is another path the natural light flows through in. Additionally the circular Ottoman style lamps allows light at night.
Ornaments: The muquarnas along the arches of the mosque are Baroque and major form of decoration. The mosque is lined with golden quranic calligraphy and has medallion with name of Allah and Prophet Muhammad on the pendentives of the structure. The two skinny minarets decorating the outside of the mosque are an example of Ottoman structure along with the main half dome and the mini half domes of the courtyard walls.

Location

The mosque stands on the second hill of Istanbul. Since the mosque is elevated above the surrounding area, the entrance is up the stairs and to the gate. The location of the complex is one surrounded by many shops, businesses, and the Grand Bazaar. Being such a prosperous and commercially active area, the Sultan knew it would be a convenient location for Muslims to attend prayer. It would also serve as a reminder to the people of the presence of the state and the Sultan during a time of political and economic misfortune. Ahmed Resmî Efendi tells a story of the Sultan being greeted by a spiritual old man, prior to the building of the complex, who cried, prayed for his health, and praised him for deciding to build a mosque on that specific piece of ground. It was after this incident that the Sultan purportedly decided to begin construction. The complex is also located just across the street from the Gate 1 entrance to the Grand Bazaar. The Column of Constantine, the historic Gazi Atik Ali Pasha Mosque, and the modern day Çemberlitaş rail station are all located directly south of the mosque within 400 meters.

Restoration (2010–2012)
The complex has been re-decorated several times over the course of its life, but a combination of environmental factors, lack of maintenance, air pollution, and original building flaws substantially degraded the state of the complex. As a result, from 2010-2012 a 20 million lira (US$3.5 million) renovation campaign was conducted by FOM group architects. The most severe issue of the complex was one of water. The leaking domes were resealed with a close-to-original lead coating and applied in traditional fashion, the drainage systems were cleared of rubble and revamped, and the basements were renovated. The walls of the mosque had been heavily blackened, required sand blasting and pressure washing. Other components of the mosque such as marble, timber, iron, and glass were cut and replaced if severely deteriorated.

During the restoration campaign, several discoveries were made that further the status of the mosque as an architectural achievement and historic site:

 In the process of scraping old deteriorated laminar ornaments, even older hand drawn ornaments were found, preserved, and set on display.
 The discovery of an active cistern underneath the mosque, which by word of Foundations Istanbul Provincial Director İbrahim Özekinci required the removal of "420 trucks’ worth of slime from the cistern. Then the magnificent gallery, cistern and water gauge became visible. The Ottomans used a modern system according to contemporary earthquake regulations." The cistern covers an area 2,242 square meters, boasts 825 square meters(8,880 sq.ft.) of usable area, and is being considered as a future location for a museum.
 It was discovered that the mosque sits on an older structure that was built using a bored-pile foundation. The oldest bored-pile foundation in the history of Turkish architecture found to date.

Current role
A historic site and notable landmark in Istanbul tourism, the mosque is used daily as a place of worship. In 2018 the Yeditepe Biennial art exhibition, organized under the administration of Turkish president Recep Tayyip Erdoğan, utilized the cistern of the complex to display works of art that showcased both traditional and modern Turkish art.

Gallery

See also
 Islamic architecture
 List of mosques
 Ottoman architecture

References

 Nuruosmaniye Complex at ArchNet.org
 Nuruosmaniye Mosque at GreatIstanbul.com

External links

 Images of Nuruosmaniye Mosque
19th century images of mosque

Religious buildings and structures completed in 1755
Ottoman mosques in Istanbul
Fatih
18th-century mosques
World Heritage Tentative List for Turkey
Baroque mosques of the Ottoman Empire